Beta-catenin-interacting protein 1 is a protein that is encoded in humans by the CTNNBIP1 gene.

Function 

The protein encoded by this gene binds CTNNB1 and prevents interaction between CTNNB1 and TCF (T-cell transcription factor) family members. The encoded protein is a negative regulator of the Wnt signaling pathway.

References

Further reading

External links